The 2004 Generali Open was a men's tennis tournament played on outdoor clay courts at the Tennis Stadium Kitzbühel in Kitzbühel, Austria and was part of the International Series Gold of the 2004 ATP Tour. It was the 49th edition of the tournament and ran from 19 July until 25 July 2004. Third-seeded Nicolás Massú won the singles title.

Finals

Singles

 Nicolás Massú  defeated  Gastón Gaudio 7–6(7–3), 6–4
 It was Massú's 1st singles title of the year and the 4th of his career.

Doubles

 František Čermák /  Leoš Friedl defeated  Lucas Arnold Ker /  Martín García 6–3, 7–5

References

External links
 ITF tournament edition details

Generali Open
Austrian Open Kitzbühel
2004 in Austrian tennis